Zakho Sport Club, also spelled as Zaxo Sport Club ( / Yana Zaxo ya Werzişî) is a sports club based in Zakho, Iraqi Kurdistan.

History
Football in Zakho was played unofficially from the early 1920s with many local amateur games as well as school competitions regularly being held in Zakho or nearby districts. This eventually led to the formation of the first ever football team in Zakho in 1948. This was made up of local workers and young men.

Beginnings

In 1986 the management team of the Zakho Youth Sporting Center which consisted of president Yousef Dawad Jabo as well as members: Ali Omran, Bashar Rahmallah, Khaled Hussein, Neshan Kerob, Khalat Ramadan and Khwaste Furman came up with the idea of starting Zakho Football Club to replace the Sporting Center or to be a part of it. According to the National Olympic Committee of Iraq one of the requirements for the creation of the club was that there was to be actual participation of the Sporting Center in sports competitions for at least one year before the club could be registered. So the sporting committee set up teams for different age groups and started competing in different Friendly Matches.

Regional Championship
In 1986 Zakho competed in a regional tournament in Duhok under the name of Zakho Youth Center against Duhok Police, Duhok Youth Center, Duhok students and Duhok SC.
Zakho went on to win the competition after defeating all the participants including Duhok FC on penalties. In addition to the regional tournament that the Sporting Center achieved, they also found success in other sports such as Basketball, Wrestling, Weightlifting and Bodybuilding which improved their establishment bid significantly. Finally on June 3, 1987 the club was officially registered.

Debut season
Since the club's inception in 1987 the club did not participate in any competition mandated by the Iraqi FA until 1990 for various reasons. Eventually they participated in the 1990/91 Third Division where they were in the Northern Group alongside At-Ta'mim club, Serwan club, Alkarma and Qurqosh. Each team would play home and away where the winner would go to the final of the 3rd league - the winner of this would be promoted to the Second Division. Zakho would top the group with 15 points but the 1991 uprisings in Iraq led to the cancellation of the remainder of the Iraqi football calendar. Zakho fans everywhere were extremely upset.

1991–92 season
The following season saw Zakho to return to sporting activities after head of the Olympic Committee Uday Hussein guaranteed not to interfere with any Northern Iraqi sportsmen. Zakho were once again in the Northern group after being drawn with Duhok SC, Qaraqosh, Al Karama and Tel Afar. Zakho topped the group after 5 wins and 3 draws and qualified to the final round.

In the final round Zakho were to play each of Samawa FC, The Neighborhood and Al Hillah. The format was each team to play each other in a single-legged tie. Zakho won the group with 7 points and were crowned Iraqi Third Division champions and qualified to the second division.

New stadium
On June 3, 2015 Zakho FC celebrated the opening of their new stadium, known as Zakho International Stadium with an unofficial friendly against the Iraqi national team. The match was notable as Shwan Jalal made his Iraq debut and kept a clean sheet in a 2-0 victory for Iraq. Despite this, the new stadium has been a success and the club's fans hope there will be bright times ahead for Zakho FC.

Premier League
Zakho continued to compete in the Iraqi Premier League. In 2015-16 the club narrowly missed out on progression to the elite league, finishing 5th in their area group just one point behind the final elite league spot.

Zakho now competes in the unified Iraqi Premier League which has eliminated the initial stages based on area for one league containing all clubs. Zakho finished 16th in the 2016-17 season having won twice and drawn 16 times during the seasons 32 games. Zakho lost the other 14 games.

Rivalries 
Zakho SC's biggest rivals are their neighbours Duhok SC, with whom they contest the Bahdinan Derby. Also, the rivalry between Zakho SC and Erbil SC is known as the "Kurdish derby".

Current squad

First-team squad

Current technical staff

{| class="toccolours"
!bgcolor=silver|Position
!bgcolor=silver|Name
!bgcolor=silver|Nationality
|- bgcolor=#eeeeee
|Coach:||Hamza Hadi||
|- 
|Assistant coach:||Mustafa Karem||
|- bgcolor=#eeeeee
|Fitness coach:||Mustafa Jasm||
|-
|Goalkeeping coach:||Nabil Awad|| 
|- bgcolor=#eeeeee
| Team manager:||Naaman Kocher||
|-
| Team supervisor:||Shvan Abdi||
|-bgcolor=#eeeeee
| Club doctor:||Makram Halabi||
|-
|Reserve team coach:||Khamis Humoud||
|- bgcolor=#eeeeee
|Reserve ass. coach:||Nawzad Ali|| 
|-
|U-19 Head coach:||Hussein Abdullah Al-Samawi||
|- bgcolor=#eeeeee
|U-16 Manager:||Bahdin Ali||
|-
|U-13 Manager:||Adnan Khairallah||
|- bgcolor=#eeeeee
|Director of football:||Taha Zakholi||
|- 
|Administrative Coordinator:||Dr. Sherzad Zakariya||
|-bgcolor=#eeeeee
|Director of public relations:||Dilzhar Adnan||
|-bgcolor=#eeeeee

Former players

  Arian Sevok

Managerial history

  Khodr Wakohdar 
  Amir Abdul Aziz 
  Pauls Quryaquos 
  Nori Zainal 
  Mohammed Ahmed Mulla 
  Sadeq Musa 
  Ali Hilal 
  Saleem Mallakh 
  Mohammed Kadhim Mizyad 
  Hadi Mtanesh 
  Saleem Mallakh 
  Adel Abdul Qader 
  Tariq Al Hejiya 
  Sabah Abdul Hassan 
  Adel Abdul Qader 
  Talib Fadhel 
  Manaf Shekho 
  Adel Abdul Qader 
  Ammori Ahmed 
  Walid Dhahad 
  Nazar Ashraf 
  Saadi Toma 
  Suleyman Ramadhan 
  Basim Qasim  
  Nadhim Shaker 
  Mohammad Kwid 
  Ali Hadi 
  Ilie Stan 
  Marin Ion 
  Essam Hamad Salem 
  Marian Mihail 
  Ahmed Wali 
  Dorinel Munteanu 
  Hadi Ahmed 
  Emad Aoda 
  Mohammed Yousef 
  Haidar Obeid Jassim 
  Salih Radhi 
  Haidar Obeid Jassim 
  Ahmad Kadhim Assad 
  Abdul-Hafeedh Arbeesh 
  Ali Hadi 
  Ahmad Salah Alwan 
  Haitham Miteb 
  Sami Bahat 
  Abdul-Wahab Abu Al-Hail

Honours
Iraqi 3rd Division
 Winners (1) : 1991–92

Iraq Division One
 Runners-up (3): 1997–98, 2001–02, 2018–19

Regional 

Kurdistan Cup
 Winners (2) : 2010–11, 2011–12

Kurdistan Super Cup
 Winners (2) : 2010–11, 2011–12

References

External links
 
 Club Page on Goalzz
 Profile on Soccerway
 Zakho on Kooora forums

Association football clubs established in 1987
1987 establishments in Iraq
Football clubs in Dohuk
Zakho